Cobi is a Polish toy company with its headquarters in Warsaw, Poland. The company was founded in 1987, producing puzzles and board games. In 1992, it started producing building blocks with an interlocking stud and tube system, compatible with Lego blocks. Due to their popularity, the company switched to mostly producing building block sets.

Themes
The Cobi catalogue is divided up by themes, with each theme having multiple brick sets. The majority of the catalogue consists of 20th and 21st century military equipment, like tanks, ships and airplanes. Lego has a policy to not make realistic weapons and military equipment, leaving an opportunity for other building block companies to fill this niche.

Cobi has various licensing deals, such as with Company of Heroes 3, along with The Tank Museum at Bovington Camp, and also for some Hollywood movies, such as Top Gun: Maverick.

Comparison to Lego
Cobi produces a larger variety of custom pieces than Lego. In recent years they've often printed their blocks, rather than using stickers. The mini figures have the same size as Lego figures, but have a more three dimensional head, with the nose sticking out, and a less blocky body.
Also, due to the restrictions of Lego concerning weapons, Cobi is one of the leaders of the building bricks company in this sector.

Merger
Cobi and Best-Lock, a British building block manufacturer with a strong presence in North America and Asia, announced a merger on February 2, 2006. The merger has since yielded co-branded building block toys. Toys are still sold under the separate labels Best-Lock and Cobi, but many Cobi sets appear in North American retailers such as Toys R' Us and Amazon.com under the Best-Lock brand.

References

External links
 
 Best-Lock website

Construction toys
Toy companies established in 1987
Manufacturing companies based in Warsaw
Toy companies of Poland
Polish brands
Polish companies established in 1987